is a Japanese high school located in Mizuho, Nishitama District, Tokyo.

The school is located near JR East's Hakonegasaki Station.

See also

References

External links
 Mizuho Nougei High School (Japanese)

Tokyo Metropolitan Government Board of Education schools
High schools in Tokyo